The 1975–76 international cricket season was from September 1975 to April 1976.

Season overview

October

West Indies in Papua New Guinea

November

West Indies in Australia

January

India in New Zealand

March

India in the West Indies

References

International cricket competitions by season
1975 in cricket
1976 in cricket